One Day We'll Talk About Today is a 2020 Indonesian family drama film directed by Angga Dwimas Sasongko and produced by Visinema Pictures. The film was adapted from the novel Nanti Kita Cerita tentang Hari Ini by Marcella FP. The film stars Rachel Amanda, Rio Dewanto, Sheila Dara Aisha, Ardhito Pramono, Donny Damara, Susan Bachtiar, Oka Antara, Niken Anjani, and Agla Artalidia. This film released on January 2, 2020.

Plot 
Angkasa (Rio Dewanto), Aurora (Sheila Dara Aisha), and Awan (Rachel Amanda) are siblings who live in a happy-looking family. After experiencing her first major failure, Awan meets Kale (Ardhito Pramono), an eccentric boy who gave Awan a new life experience, about breaking, rising, falling, growing, being, and all the fears of people in general. The change in Awan's attitude leads to pressure from her parents. This prompts the rebellion of the three siblings, which leads to the discovery of bigger secrets and trauma in their family.

Cast 
 Rachel Amanda as Awan
 Gween Nastusha Ellvania as baby Awan
 Alleyra Fakhira as 6-year-old Awan 
 Rio Dewanto as Angkasa
 Muhammad Adhiyat as 6-year-old Angkasa 
 Sinyo Riza as 12-year-old Angkasa
 Sheila Dara Aisha as Aurora
 Nayla D. Purnama as 9-year-old Aurora 
 Syaqila Afiffah Putri as 3-year-old Aurora
 Donny Damara as Narendra
 Oka Antara as Young Narendra 
 Susan Bachtiar as Ajeng
 Niken Anjani as Young Ajeng
 Ardhito Pramono as Kale
 Agla Artalidia as Lika
 Umay Shahab as Uya
 Sivia Azizah as Revina
 Chicco Jerikho as Anton
 Joe Project P as a Member of Anton
 Isyana Sarasvati as Awan's daughter
 Arswendi Nasution as a Doctor
 Dayu Wijanto as a Sister
 Gary Iskak as Gary

Production 
On February 11, 2019, Visinema announced that he would convert the novel Nanti Kita Cerita tentang Hari Ini into a film of the same name. Angga Dwimas Sasongko was announced to be the director of this film. Jenny Jusuf which involved in writing this screenplay is a figure behind a number of films that are quite successful such as Filosofi Kopi and Critical Eleven. IDN Media,  Blibli.com, and XRM Media were involved in the production of this film as executive producers. Cast of the film was announced on August 7, 2019.

Release and reception 
On July 14, 2019, the film is planned to be aired in January 2020. In November, the exact date of the screening of the film was announced on January 9, 2020, which was then advanced to January 2, 2020 a few weeks later.

Arnidhya Nur Zhafira from "Antara" praised the very strong characterization of all the main actors, causing closeness to the audience. Rieska Utami who wrote for "Cultura" praised the director, screenwriter, actor and actress for performing a role so well that the verses of poetry in the novel can be conveyed flexibly.

Awards and nominations

Soundtrack 
Isyana Sarasvati – Untuk Hati yang Terluka. (For the Broken Hearted.)
Hindia – Secukupnya (Just Enough)
Ardhito Pramono – Bitter Love, Fine Today 
Kunto Aji – Rehat (Take a Rest)
ARAH – I Want to Rock N Roll, Awal & Akhir (The Beginning and the End)
Chiki Fawzi – Belukar Dunia (World Grove)
Sisir Tanah – Lagu Pejalan (The Walker's Song)

References

External links 
 

2020s coming-of-age drama films
Indonesian coming-of-age drama films
Films based on Indonesian novels
2020 films
2020 drama films
Indonesian children's films
2020s children's drama films
2020s Indonesian-language films